Polychronis Tzortzakis (born 3 January 1989 in Chania) is a Greek road and track cyclist, who currently rides for UCI Continental team . Representing Greece, he competed in the team pursuit event at the 2010 and 2011 UCI Track Cycling World Championships.

Major results

2006
 2nd Road race, National Junior Road Championships
2007
 1st  Road race, National Junior Road Championships
2010
 National Road Championships
1st  Under-23 time trial
2nd Road race
2011
 National Road Championships
1st  Under-23 time trial
3rd Road race
 6th Overall Tour of Greece
 9th Points race, UCI Track Cycling World Championships
2012
 1st Stage 2 Trophée de l'Essor
 2nd Time trial, National Road Championships
2013
 1st Stage 1 Tour du Loiret
 1st Stage 1 Tour Nivernais Morvan
 1st Boucles Dunoises
 2nd Dijon–Auxonne–Dijon
 3rd Time trial, National Road Championships
 8th Time trial, Mediterranean Games
2014
 1st  Time trial, National Road Championships
 1st La Castelbriantaise
2015
 1st  Road race, National Road Championships
 3rd Belgrade–Banja Luka I
 6th Paris–Mantes-en-Yvelines
2016
 National Road Championships
2nd Time trial
2nd Road race
 4th Belgrade–Banja Luka I
 7th Belgrade–Banja Luka II
2017
 National Road Championships
1st  Time trial
3rd Road race
 10th Hong Kong Challenge
2018
 National Road Championships
1st  Road race
2nd Time trial
 8th Time trial, Mediterranean Games
2019
 National Road Championships
1st  Time trial
2nd Road race
 1st  Overall Tour d'Egypte
1st Prologue
 1st  Overall In the steps of Romans
1st Stage 1
 Tour du Maroc
1st  Points classification
1st Stages 7 & 8
 4th Bursa Orhangazi Race
 6th International Rhodes Grand Prix
 7th Bursa Yildirim Bayezit Race
2020
 National Road Championships
1st  Time trial
3rd Road race
2021
 1st  Time trial, National Road Championships
 3rd Overall Tour of Estonia
 Tour de la Guadeloupe
1st Stages 3 & 5
1st  Points classification
1st  Combativity classification
2022
 10th Overall Tour of Thailand

References

External links

1989 births
Living people
Greek male cyclists
Greek track cyclists
Sportspeople from Chania
European Games competitors for Greece
Cyclists at the 2015 European Games
Cyclists at the 2019 European Games
Competitors at the 2013 Mediterranean Games
Competitors at the 2018 Mediterranean Games
Mediterranean Games competitors for Greece
Olympic cyclists of Greece
Cyclists at the 2020 Summer Olympics
21st-century Greek people